Noah Star Navigation 2023 was a two-night professional wrestling event promoted by CyberFight's sub-brand Pro Wrestling Noah. It took place on February 5 and March 9, 2023, in Tokyo, Japan, at the Korakuen Hall. The event aired CyberAgent's AbemaTV online linear television service and CyberFight's streaming service Wrestle Universe.

Storylines
The event featured a total of seventeen professional wrestling matches (eight in the first night and nine in the second) that involve different wrestlers from pre-existing scripted feuds and storylines. Wrestlers portray villains, heroes, or less distinguishable characters in scripted events that build tension and culminate in a wrestling match or series of matches.

Night 1

Preliminary matches
The first night of the event which took place on February 5, started with the confrontation between Tadasuke and Hi69 and Kinya Okada and Daishi Ozawa which solded with the victory of the preceding team. The second bout saw Super Crazy getting a victory over Yasutaka Yano in singles competition. Next up, Timothy Thatcher and Hideki Suzuki of Sugiura-gun defeated Masaaki Mochizuki and Shuhei Taniguchi in tag team action. The fourth bout saw the team of Kenoh, Katsuhiko Nakajima, Shuji Kondo and Hajime Ohara outmatching Daiki Inaba, Yoshiki Inamura, Ninja Mack and Atsushi Kotoge. In the fifth match, one half of the GHC Tag Team Champions Satoshi Kojima defeated Masa Kitamiya in singles action. Next, Kaito Kiyomiya, Naomichi Marafuji and Takashi Sugiura defeated the team of Jack Morris, Jake Lee and Anthony Greene, bout after Kiyomiya fired up his short-term feud with Morris which eventually concluded with their clash for the GHC Heavyweight Championship seven days later at Great Voyage in Osaka. In the semi main event, GHC Junior Heavyweight Tag Team Champions Yoshinari Ogawa and Eita alongside Nosawa Rongai, Chris Ridgeway and Daga defeated Amakusa, Junta Miyawaki, Alejandro, Yo-Hey and Seiki Yoshioka in an elimination tag team match from which Miwayaki was last eliminated.

Main event
In the main event, El Hijo de Dr. Wagner Jr. defeated Manabu Soya to secure his second consecutive defense of the GHC National Championship.

Night 2

The second night from March 9 show concentrated on the retirement match of Daisuke Harada. On March 2, 2023, Pro Wrestling Noah announced that he was forced to end his career due to sustaining serious injuries.

Preliminary matches
He preshow matches have been brpadcast on Noah's YouTube channel. In the first one, Shuji Kondo, Tadasuke and Hajime Ohara picked up a win over Kinya Okada, Yasutaka Yano and Daishi Ozawa in six-man tag team action. The second one portraited the confrontation between Super Crazy, Extreme Tiger and Lanzeloth, and Yo-Hey, Seiki Yoshioka and Alejandro, bout solded with the victory of the preceding team. The first match of the main card saw a one-minute exhibition match which represented Daisuke Harada's retirement match in which he went into a draw against his "Momo No Seishun Tag" partner Atsushi Kotoge. Next up, Takashi Sugiura, Kazuyuki Fujita and Hideki Suzuki outmatched the team of Naomichi Marufuji, Masaaki Mochizuki and Shuhei Taniguchi. The fifth nout saw Kenoh, Katsuhiko Nakajima and Manabu Soya defeating Yoshiki Inamura and the GHC Tag Team Champions Masa Kitamiya and Daiki Inaba. The preceding team picked up the victory. After the bout concluded, All Japan Pro Wrestling's reigning World Tag Team Champions Yuma Aoyagi and Takuya Nomura laid a challenge for Kenoh and Soya for the second night of AJPW's Dream Power Series event from March 21, 2023. Next up, one half of the reigning GHC Junior Heavyweight Tag Team Champions Eita defeated Hayata as a result of a disqualification after the latter attacked him with the title belt during match. In the seventh match, Chris Ridgeway defeated the other GHC Junior Heavyweight Tag Team Champion Yoshinari Ogawa by submission. The sixth and seventh matches occurred as a build-up for Eita and Ogawa's junior title defense over Hayata and Ridgeway from Great Voyage in Yokohama 2023. In the semi main event, Jake Lee and Anthony Greene picked up a win over Kaito Kiyomiya and Atsushi Kotoge. The bout also took part in the build-up for the GHC Heavyweight Championship match between Kiyomiya and Lee from Great Voyage.

Main event
In the main event of the show, Amakusa defeated Hi69 and secured the second consecutive defense of the GHC Junior Heavyweight Championship in that respective reign.

Notes

References

External links
 Pro Wrestling Noah official website

Pro Wrestling Noah
CyberAgent
2023 in professional wrestling
March 2023 events in Japan
Professional wrestling in Tokyo
Pro Wrestling Noah shows